NGC 605 is a lenticular galaxy in the constellation Andromeda, which is about 234 million light-years from the Milky Way. It was discovered on October 21, 1881 by the French astronomer Édouard Jean-Marie Stephan.

References 

605
Lenticular galaxies
Andromeda (constellation)
005891